The Los Angeles County Department of Public Works (LACDPW) is responsible for the construction and operation of Los Angeles County's roads, building safety, sewerage, and flood control. DPW also operates traffic signals and intelligent transportation systems, drinking water systems in certain communities, operates five airports, paratransit and fixed route public transport, administers various environment programs, issues various permits for activities in the public roadway, and has a Department Emergency Operations Center that works in conjunction with the County Emergency Operations Center operated by the Sheriff's Department. The department is headquartered at 900 South Fremont Avenue in Alhambra, California.

Services are provided primarily to the unincorporated county with some services provided to contract cities. Flood control and watershed management services are provided to all of the county except the Antelope Valley.

As part of its flood control and water supply responsibilities, the Department of Public Works has 15 major dams and 27 spreading grounds in the county. Pacoima Dam is one of the largest owned by Public Works and survived the Northridge earthquake in 1994 intact.

Water from the dams is released into flood-control channels and some is diverted into spreading basins where it percolates into the ground and recharges the groundwater. The surface water is not used directly as it requires more cleaning than groundwater. Near the coast, the department has constructed sea water barriers that use injection wells to create a fresh water barrier to prevent salt water intrusion from the ocean into the groundwater.

The DPW is a leader in watershed management. It provides storm drain education programs, publishes and enforces best management practices for activities that may affect the watershed, and manages watersheds to provide a balance between flood control, recreation, and protecting the natural environment.

History
The department was formed in 1985 in a consolidation of the county Road Department, the Flood Control District (in charge of dams, spreading grounds, and channels), and the County Engineer (in charge of building safety, land survey, waterworks).

For 25 years, the County Engineer Department was housed in the historic Higgins Building, a 10-story Beaux-Arts style commercial building that was designed and built by noted architect Arthur L. Haley and engineer Albert Carey Martin in 1910, at the corner of Second and Main Streets in Downtown Los Angeles. After "overseeing construction projects large and small from one of the city's strongest buildings, the county determined that the department needed more modern quarters and pulled up stakes in 1977," according to the Los Angeles City Planning Department, which designated the building as the Historic-Cultural Monument #873.

In 1977, the County Engineer Department moved to the corner of 5th Street and Vermont Ave., Los Angeles until the merge of the three departments. At that time the department was called the Department of County Engineer-Facilities.

For years, the Flood Control District and the County Road Department were headquartered in buildings at Alcazar Street in East Los Angeles by the Los Angeles County General Hospital.

Major divisions of the Public Works Department were located at various locations in Los Angeles city for a number of years, until the 12-story glass building in Alhambra, California was purchased and refurbished. This tallest structure in Alhambra was formerly the western headquarters of Sears, Roebuck and Company, where some fixture units still bear the label "Sears". The steel frames were strengthened in 2006 after it was learned from the Northridge earthquake that the welded joints were not adequate to withstand a major earthquake.

Former Directors

 Thomas A. Tidemanson  (1985–1994)
 Harry Stone  (1994–2001)  
 James Noyes  (2001–2004)
 Donald Wolfe  (2004–2008)
 Gail Farber (2008–2016)
 Mark Pestrella (2016–present)

Major Divisions
Architectural and Engineering Division – designs various buildings and facilities for other county departments
Aviation Division – operates the five general aviation airports: Fox Field (Lancaster), Brackett Field (La Verne), Whiteman Airport (Pacoima), Compton/Woodley Airport (Compton), and El Monte Airport (El Monte)
Administrative Services Division – provides contract support, fleet, procurement and warehousing services for the Department
Building and Safety Division – regulates construction on private properties
Business Relations and Contracts Division – consisted of two sections: Contract Section I and Contract Section II
Construction Division – advertises and awards public contracts and performs inspection, construction management, and environmental compliance during construction of public works projects
Design Division – designs departmental facilities
Environmental Programs Division – promotes recycling, and regulates underground storage tanks and industrial waste disposal
Fiscal Division – The Fiscal Division is responsible for the accounting, cashiering, billing, accounts payable, accounts receivable, cost accounting, and fixed asset property records for the Department of Public Works.
Fleet Management Division (Fleet) – support Public Works’ operational divisions that provide critical services throughout the unincorporated county and 88 contract cities. 
Flood Maintenance Division – flood protection, water conservation, groundwater recharge, runoff control, and storm-water quality are addressed and provided; along with proactively meeting or exceeding environmental and water quality regulations and standards. 
Geotechnical and Materials Engineering Division – Ensures proper land development from geology and soils engineering to subdivision mapping standards
Land Development Division – regulates the developments in private lands
Project Management Division – manages capital project constructions for the County
Programs Development Division – manages funding programs and operates transit services in the unincorporated County
Road Maintenance Division – maintains the various streets and roads in the unincorporated portions of the County
Sewer Maintenance Division – operates and maintains sewers, pumping stations and sewage treatment plants
Stormwater Engineering Division – handles water conservation, and operates and maintains three seawater barriers
Stormwater Maintenance Division – operates and maintains dams, open channels, storm drains, debris basins, check dams and pumping plants
Stormwater Planning Division – handles strategic planning and multi-benefit project development for the Los Angeles County Flood Control District
Stormwater Quality Division – handles stormwater quality  and the National Pollutant Discharge Elimination System Permit Program 
Survey/Mapping and Property Management Division – provides survey services, maintains public land/survey records. Property Management includes title  investigations, appraisal, project coordination, right of way engineering and acquisitions and dispositions.                                                  
Traffic and Lighting Division – handles the traffic controls and lights on the streets of the unincorporated portions of the County
Waterworks Division – provides water services

Transportation
LACDPW operates shuttles in unincorporated areas of the county, and funds other agencies that provide service.

Routes
County Shuttles
Acton/Agua Dulce Shuttle (connects with the Newhall Metrolink station)
Avocado Heights/Bassett/West Valinda Shuttle
East Valinda Shuttle
Edmund D. Edelman Children's Court Shuttle (connects with the Cal State LA station)
Heights Hopper Shuttle (Hacienda Heights)
Wellness Center
Beach Bus (Warner Center–Santa Monica Beaches via Topanga Canyon
El Sol (East Los Angeles)
City Terrace / East Los Angeles College 
Whittier Boulevard / Saybrook Park
Union Pacific / Salazar Park
the Link
Athens Shuttle (connects with Vermont/Athens Metro Rail station)
Baldwin Hills Parklands Shuttle (weekends/holidays only; connects La Cienega/Jefferson station with Kenneth Hahn State Recreation Area)
Florence-Firestone/Walnut Park Shuttle (connects with Florence station)
King Medical Center Campus Shuttle (connects with Willowbrook/Rosa Parks station)
Lennox Shuttle (connects with Hawthorne/Lennox station)
Willowbrook Shuttle Route A & B (connects with Willowbrook/Rosa Parks station)
Sunshine Shuttle (South Whittier) Routes A, B and C

DPW offers funding support for City of Santa Clarita Transit, Antelope Valley Transit Authority's TRANSporter, and for LADOT's DASH Boyle Heights/East Los Angeles route. Los Angeles County is part of the Antelope Valley Transit Authority and the Palos Verdes Peninsula Transit Authority.

Controversies

In 1988, the department issued a demolition permit to tear down the historic Golden Gate Theater in East Los Angeles. Demolition commenced before officials led by then County Supervisor Ed Edelman halted the work with a stop-work order. Demolition crews had already begun to dismantle the walls when Edelman, then Los Angeles City Councilwoman Gloria Molina, sheriff's deputies and more than 50 concerned community members showed up at the site to ensure the demolition work was halted.  Edelman blamed a "foul-up" in the Public Works Department for issuing the demolition permit and assured the gathered crowd that heads were going to roll and that he would "try and stop this damn demolition before it happens."

See also

Los Angeles County Department of Public Works dams
Eaton Wash Reservoir
Morris Reservoir

References

External links
Los Angeles County Department of Public Works web site
Lakewood Accountability Action Group A group of County Residents that lives in Lakewood California (within Supervisor Knabe's district) and often assists cyclists and others with getting the LA County Dept. of Public Works to repair and or fix issues with the San Gabriel River Bike Path.

 
Government of Los Angeles County, California
County government agencies in California
Alhambra, California